"Trip to Heaven" is a 1973 single by Freddie Hart and the Heartbeats.  "Trip to Heaven" was Freddie Hart's sixth and final number one on the country chart.  The single stayed at number one for a single week and spent a total of thirteen weeks on the country chart.

Chart performance

References 
 

Freddie Hart songs
1973 singles
Songs written by Freddie Hart
Capitol Records singles
1973 songs